Kovelamudi Raghavendra Rao (born 23 May 1942) is an Indian film director, screenwriter, and producer known for his works predominantly in Telugu cinema besides having directed a few Hindi films. He has garnered four state Nandi Awards and five Filmfare Awards South. In a film career spanning more than four decades, Rao has directed more than a hundred feature films across multiple genres such as romantic comedy, fantasy, melodrama, action thriller, biographical and romance films.

Rao received the state Nandi Award for Best Director for his works such as Bobbili Brahmanna (1984), and Pelli Sandadi (1996). He garnered the Filmfare Award for Best Director – Telugu for the drama film Prema Lekhalu (1977), the fantasy film Jagadeka Veerudu Athiloka Sundari (1990), and the romance film Allari Priyudu (1993). Rao is known for his works in hagiographical films such as Annamayya (1997), which won two National Film Awards, and was also showcased at the 1998 International Film Festival of India in the mainstream section. Rao also received the Nandi Award for Best Direction, the Filmfare Award for Best Direction for his work in the film. His other hagiographic works such as Sri Manjunatha (2001), Sri Ramadasu (2006), Shirdi Sai (2012) and Om Namo Venkatesaya (2017), received several state honours.

His mainstream works such as the 1987 social problem film Agni Putrudu, and the 1988 action thriller Aakhari Poratam, were screened at the 11th and 12th International Film Festival of India respectively in the mainstream section. In 1992, he directed the melodrama Gharana Mogudu which premiered at the 1993 International Film Festival of India in the mainstream section. Next, he directed the instant hit Allari Priyudu (1993), which also premiered at the 1994 International Film Festival of India in the mainstream section.

Personal life
Raghavendra Rao was born on 23 May 1942 to veteran director K. S. Prakash Rao and Koteswaramma. He is also the father of actor turned filmmaker Prakash Kovelamudi. Raghavendra Rao was an executive member in the Tirumala Tirupati Devasthanams Board from 2015 to 2019.

Awards and honors
Nandi Awards
NTR National Award - 2015
B. N. Reddy National Award for lifetime contribution to Telugu cinema (2009)
Best Director – Annamayya (1997)
Best Choreographer – Pelli Sandadi (1996)
Best Director – Pelli Sandadi (1996)
Best Director – Allari Priyudu (1993)
Best Director – Bobbili Brahmanna (1984)

Filmfare Awards South
Best Director – Prema Lekhalu (1977)
Best Director – Jagadeka Veerudu Athiloka Sundari (1990)
Best Director – Allari Priyudu (1993)
Best Director – Annamayya (1997)
Lifetime Achievement Award (2002)

IIFA Awards 
Outstanding contribution to Indian cinema (2017)

SIIMA Awards
Lifetime Achievement Award (2014)

CineMAA Awards
Lifetime Contribution Award – (2012)
Best Film (Jury) – Shirdi Sai – (2013)

Other Awards
Allu Rama Lingaiah Award (2016)

Filmography

Director

Actor

Supervisor of direction

Associate director

Producer

Presenter

Choreographer

Television
2002: Santhi Nivasam (ETV Telugu)
2010: Arundathi (ETV Kannada)
2013: Mangammagari Manavaralu (Zee telugu)
2014: Soundrya Lahari (ETV Telugu)
2016: Koyilamma (MAA TV)
2017: Sye Sye Sayyare (ETV Telugu)
2017: Agnisakshi (Star MAA)
2018: Siri Siri Muvvalu  (Star MAA)
2020: C/o Anasuya (Star MAA)
2021: Krishna Tulasi (Zee telugu)

References

External links
 

Living people
Telugu film directors
Kannada film directors
21st-century Indian film directors
Filmfare Awards South winners
Nandi Award winners
Hindi-language film directors
Telugu film producers
Hindi film producers
Indian film choreographers
People from Krishna district
Film people from Andhra Pradesh
Dancers from Andhra Pradesh
20th-century Indian film directors
Film producers from Andhra Pradesh
Film directors from Andhra Pradesh
Screenwriters from Andhra Pradesh
1941 births
South Indian International Movie Awards winners